All Saints' Church, Kings Langley is a parish church in the Church of England, located in the village of Kings Langley in Hertfordshire, England. Originating in the 13th century, the church contains the tomb of Edmund of Langley (1341–1402), the first Duke of York. It is a Grade II* listed building.

Description
The exterior of All Saints' Church is flint with dressings of Totternhoe Stone. It has red tile roofs and a squat, buttressed bell tower with battlements and a "spike" or small central spire. The church is mostly in the Perpendicular style, but was heavily restored in the Victorian era. Internally, the nave has three bays with a clerestory and north and south aisles which both terminate in chapels, in line with the east end of the chancel.

History

The first record of a parish church at Kings Langley was in 1215, when a grant of advowson (the right of a patron to appoint a parish priest) was confirmed by King John. The earliest part of the church is the chancel which is dated to the 13th century, due to the remnants of lancet windows in the Early English style and the double piscina in the south wall. The nave is fourteenth century, probably overlying an earlier structure, but the arcades date from the 15th century when the north and south aisles were rebuilt. The north chapel and the three-storey tower were added later in the same century; the earliest of the six bells present today is dated 1657. In 1575, the tomb of Edmund of Langley, 1st Duke of York, (1341–1402) was brought to the church when King's Langley Priory was dissolved; it was initially sited in the chancel, flanking the high altar. The hexagonal 17th-century wooden pulpit survives, with its original tester or sounding board.

In 1877, the north aisle was extended to form a new royal chapel to which Edmund's tomb was relocated from the chancel in the following year; Queen Victoria donated the window beneath which it now stands. At the same time, an alabaster reredos designed by Joseph Clarke was erected behind the altar, and a new east window in the Perpendicular style was installed, revealing in the process the remains of the earliest lancets. Further work in 1894 saw the addition of a choir vestry to the south and the rebuilding of the north porch. In 1899 the clerestory windows and the top of the tower were rebuilt. In 1976, a polygonal church room in a contemporary style was also added to the south. The church became a Grade II* listed building in January 1967.

References

Kings Langley
Kings Langley
Dacorum